Instinctus Bestialis is the ninth full-length studio album by Norwegian black metal act Gorgoroth. It was released on 8 June 2015 by Soulseller Records. It was also released digitally, as well as on digipak CD in a limited first pressing, limited black vinyl LP and limited picture vinyl LP. It is the first album to feature vocalist Atterigner and was the last to feature bassist Bøddel, who died from cancer four months after the album's release. The album cover is taken from a painting called Christ in Limbo.

Track listing

Personnel

Gorgoroth
Atterigner – vocals
Infernus – guitars, production
Bøddel – bass
Asklund – drums, recording, mixing, production, mastering

Additional personnel
Chris Cannella – guest lead guitar (track 5)
Fábio Zperandio – guest lead guitar (track 5)
Henrik "Typhos" Ekeroth – guest lead guitar (track 6)
Mats Lindfors – mixing, mastering

Charts

References

Gorgoroth albums
2015 albums